The Journal of Inflammation Research is a peer-reviewed medical journal covering research on inflammation. The journal was established in 2008 and is published by Dove Medical Press. According to the Journal Citation Reports, the journal has a 2020 impact factor of 6.922.

References

External links 
 

English-language journals
Open access journals
Dove Medical Press academic journals
Publications established in 2008
Immunology journals